Poppin' the Hood! is the debut stand-up comedy album by the Sklar Brothers, released in 2004 by Stand Up! Records.

The album was recorded in 2003 at Acme Comedy Company in Minneapolis.

Track listing
"Magic" -8:18
"Local Commercial" -5:59
"Network Logos" -4:23
"Where are They Now" -1:57
"Morning Zoo" -1:43
"KSHE95" -3:16
"Hector" -3:18
"Girls Gone Wild" -2:52
"Bowflex" -2:59
"Feldenkrais" -0:57
"Walk With Israel" -1:05
"Dad" -5:36
"Guiltor" -2:12
"Strip Club DJ" -2:44
"Power 106" -1:50
"Local News Car Chase" -3:03
"Chopper 4" -3:11

References

External links
 The Sklar Brothers official website
 Sklar Brothers Facebook Fan Page
 Stand Up! Records Sklar Brothers page

Sklar Brothers albums
2004 debut albums
Stand Up! Records live albums
2000s comedy albums